60S ribosomal protein L12 is a protein that in humans is encoded by the RPL12 gene.

Function 

Ribosomes, the organelles that catalyze protein synthesis, consist of a small 40S subunit and a large 60S subunit. Together these subunits are composed of 4 RNA species and approximately 80 structurally distinct proteins. This gene encodes a ribosomal protein that is a component of the 60S subunit. The protein belongs to the L11P family of ribosomal proteins. It is located in the cytoplasm. The protein binds directly to the 26S rRNA. This gene is co-transcribed with the U65 snoRNA, which is located in its fourth intron. As is typical for genes encoding ribosomal proteins, there are multiple processed pseudogenes of this gene dispersed through the genome.

Interactions 

RPL12 has been shown to interact with CDC5L.

References

Further reading

External links 
 

Ribosomal proteins